The 1907–08 Northern Football League season was the nineteenth in the history of the Northern Football League, a football competition in Northern England.

A Championship Play-Off between South Bank and Stockton, who finished the season level on points, was played on 19 September 1908 at the home ground of Darlington St. Augustine's. South Bank were declared League Champions after a 2–0 victory.

Clubs

The league featured 11 clubs which competed in the last season, along with one new club: 
 Saltburn

League table

Championship match
19 September 1908: South Bank 2–0 Stockton

References

1907-08
1907–08 in English association football leagues